The twenty first 1979 Balkan basketball tournament was held in Athens, Greece. Five national teams from Balkan area took part in the competition.

Medalists

Results 

14.09 Greece-Turkey 92-71(40-44)

14.09 Bulgaria-Romania 84-91(37-52)

15.09 Greece-Romania 71-64(44-24)

15.09 Turkey-Yugoslavia 62-88(36-41)

16.09 Turkey-Romania 75-72(34-32)

16.09 Bulgaria-Yugoslavia 64-87(36-47)

17.09 Greece-Bulgaria 64-62(34-31)

17.09 Romania-Yugoslavia 60-82(26-37)

18.09 Greece-Yugoslavia 66-62(26-35)

18.09 Turkey-Bulgaria 79-66(48-30)

Final rankings

External links
Τι έγινε στις 20 προηγούμενες βαλκανιάδες - Αθλητική Ηχώ 14/9/1979, σελ.5
ALBANIAN BASKET IN INTERNATIONAL FIELD
Delo newspaper
Slobodna Dalmacija newspaper
Milliyet newspaper
Cumhuriyet newspaper
Romanian newspaper
Greek games in 1979

Sources
 Durupınar, Mehmet. Türk Basketbolunun 100 yıllık tarihi, (2009). Efes Pazarlama ve Dağıtım Ticaret A.Ş. 
 Milivoje Karalejić, Saša Jakovljević, Žarko Kandić, Vladimir Stanković, Milan Tasić, Ivica Mihajlović.  Košarkaška enciklopedija 1946-2000 : muške reprezentacije (2001) 
 100 χρόνια Μπάσκετ 1891–1991, Περιοδικό Τρίποντο, 1991

Basketball competitions in Europe between national teams
International basketball competitions hosted by Albania
International basketball competitions hosted by Bulgaria
International basketball competitions hosted by Greece
International basketball competitions hosted by Romania
International basketball competitions hosted by Turkey
International basketball competitions hosted by Yugoslavia
Sport in the Balkans